The Battle of San Rafael fought between Filipino revolutionaries under the leadership of Anacleto “Matanglawin” Enriquez against the Spanish army headed by Commandant Lopez Arteaga.

Attack 
On their way from the town of Paombong, Bulacan to the mountain ranges of Bulacan, General Isidoro Torres of Malolos decided to divide the troop of Katipuneros into two: one group under his supervision while the other under the guidance of General Enriquez and his brother Colonel Vicente Enriquez. The group of General Enriquez was supposedly heading to the town of Baliuag, Bulacan but decided to stay instead in San Rafael, believing it to be a strategic site. Unknowingly, a Spanish troop from Manila heading towards San Rafael, prepared to silence the Filipino insurgents. The battle started at around 7 a.m. on November 30, 1896. The Spanish forces were so strong that General Enriquez ordered a retreat to the San Rafael. Sometime in the middle of the battle, some of the Filipino troops including Colonel Enriquez were separated from the rest of the group and headed to the town of Bigaa (now Balagtas). At around noon, the Spanish army forced the church doors open and murdered the Filipino revolutionaries seeking shelter in the church. It is estimated that nearly 800 people were killed in the battle, most of whom were children and other locals.

Aftermath 
The number of casualties was so immense that it was believed that blood spilled in the church reached ankle-deep. The gobernadorcillo of San Rafael ordered a mass grave to be made near the church. It is believed that the Battle of San Rafael inspired the young general Gregorio Del Pilar (a close friend of General Anacleto Enriquez) to join the revolution against Spain.

References

San Rafael
History of Bulacan
San Rafael
San Rafael